Splendrillia praeclara is a species of sea snail, a marine gastropod mollusk in the family Drilliidae.

Description

Distribution
This marine species occurs off Western India.

References

 Melvill J.C. (1893). Descriptions of twenty-five new species of marine shells from Bombay collected by Alexander Abercrombie, Esq.. Memoirs and Proceedings of the Manchester Literary and Philosophical Society 7: 52–67, 1 pl

External links
  Tucker, J.K. 2004 Catalog of recent and fossil turrids (Mollusca: Gastropoda). Zootaxa 682:1-1295.
  Petit, R. E. (2009). George Brettingham Sowerby, I, II & III: their conchological publications and molluscan taxa. Zootaxa. 2189: 1–218

praeclara
Gastropods described in 1893